Harela is a Hindu festival celebrated in the Indian state of Uttarakhand and in some regions of Himachal Pradesh. This festival is very popular in the Kumaun region of Uttarakhand, and is celebrated by the name Harela (हरेला). This name is used in some places of Garhwal but, it is not commonly used, as the festival is celebrated as Mol-Sankranti (म्वोळ-संक्रांति) or as Rai-Sagrān (रै-सग्रान). It is called Hariyali/Rihyali in Kangra, Shimla and Sirmour regions, Dakhrain in Jubbal and Kinnaur regions of Himachal Pradesh. This festival is celebrated on the first day of Shravan-Maas (Shravan-Sankranti/Kark-Sankranti), as per the Hindu Luni-Solar calendar. This festival marks the onset of the Rainy-Season (Monsoon).  They pray for a good harvest and prosperity. Harela means "Day of Green", and Agriculture-based communities in the region consider it highly auspicious, as it marks the beginning of the sowing cycle in their fields. Multiple Kauthigs/Thols/Melas (Fairs) are also organized on this festival.

Belief 
The primary belief of this festival lies in the probable origins of Neo-lithic fertility festivals, which were marked as the religious celebration of the wedding of Lord Shiva and Goddess Parvati,

Significance and Celebration in Kumaun 
Harela has a great significance in Kumaon. This symbolizes a new harvest and the rainy season. It has become a common practice to attribute a slogan of – "Save The Environment" to Harela. Schools in Uttarakhand often encourage their students to plant saplings either at home, school or with the support of local officials.
In Kumaun, the two celebrations during Navrati – first during Chaitra Navrati in the month of Chaitra, and second during Sharad Navratri in the month of Ashwin, is also considered to be connected to Harela. This is followed by Bhaitauli or Bhitauli wherein gifts are given to girls of the family. The Shravan Harela is celebrated as the first day (Kark Sankranti) of the Hindu calendar month of Shravan (late July). Ten days before the due date, 5 or 7 types of seeds are sown in buckets by the head of every family. Water is then sprinkled over them. After the due time, but before the actual celebration, a mock wedding is done by young ones. This is followed by people worshiping the statues of Lord Shiva and Goddess Parvati. It is also marked by playing 'Gedi'. It is a game where small children mount on bamboo sticks and walk around farms. The harvested herbs (also called by the same name, harela) are taken as God's blessings. Elders of the home put harela on the heads of others, touching the harela from their head to feet. A blessing verse is also chanted while putting harela. This is the symbol for the rainy season and the new harvest. People also eat the seeds of the new harvest after heating them. People meet their relatives, and enjoy the festival. Some people also sow the seeds of new plants in the soil or fields and join their hands in the form of 'Pranam' for saving the environment. 
People make clay statues of Lord Shiva and Goddess Parvati known as Dikare or Dikars, and worship them. Harela symbolizes the new harvest of the rainy season every year.

Significance in Garhwal and Himachal-Pradesh 
In Garhwal and Himachal, people take their village deity to an open place, and sing and dance in front of the idol. Since deities mostly do not travel during monsoon, all the Dev-Dolis return to their Mool-Gram before the onset of Monsoon, which is followed by some celebration.
In Garhwal, there is a tradition of planting saplings/plants on this day, either by an individual, a family, or by the community. 
It is usually celebrated on 16 July as it is the beginning or the first day of Shravan Maas (rainy season)

See also
 Harela mela

References

External links
 Harela and Bhitauli 

Festivals in Uttarakhand
Hindu festivals
Kumaon division
 Garhwal division
Seasonal traditions
Harvest festivals in India
March observances
April observances
July observances
September observances
October observances

Religious festivals in India